Andrés Llinás Montejo (born 23 July 1997) is a Colombian professional footballer who plays as a centre-back for Millonarios and the Colombia national team.

Club career
Llinás began playing football with the youth academy of Millonarios at the age of 9 in 2006. He had two stints on loan with the youth academy of Real Madrid and Hellas Verona before returning to Millonarios. He made his professional and Copa Colombia as a late sub with Millonarios in a 1–1 Copa Colombia tie with Tigres on 30 April 2015. He spent the 2018 season on loan with Valledupar in the Categoría Primera B. Returning once more to Millonarios, and after strong performances extended his contract with the club on 30 December 2020.

International career
Llinás received his first call-up to the senior Colombia national team for a set of 2022 FIFA World Cup qualification in August 2021. He made his debut with them as a half-time sub in a 2–1 friendly win over Honduras on 16 January 2022.

Personal life
Llinás is of Spanish descent and holds a Spanish passport. His father, Camilo Llinás, is a sports executive in Colombia who was vice president of Millonarios from 2002 to 2003, president of the Liga de fútbol de Bogotá from 2015 to 2020 and vice minister of communications and secretary of the government of the city of Bogotá.

References

External links
 
 

1997 births
Living people
Footballers from Bogotá
Colombian footballers
Colombia international footballers
Colombian people of Spanish descent
Association football defenders
Valledupar F.C. footballers
Millonarios F.C. players
Categoría Primera A players
Categoría Primera B players